Nododelphinulidae is an extinct family of fossil gastropods in the superfamily Amberleyoidea (according to the taxonomy of the Gastropoda by Bouchet & Rocroi, 2005). This family has no subfamilies.

Genera 
Genera within the family Nododelphinulidae include:
 † Amphitrochus Cossmann, 1907 
 † Costatrochus Gründel, 2009 
 † Falsamotrochus Gründel & Hostettler, 2014 
 † Helicacanthus Dacque, 1938 
 † Laubetrochus Gründel & Hostettler, 2014 
 † Nododelphinula Cossmann, 1916, the type genus
 † Nododelphinula buckmani (Morris & Lycett, 1850)

References